The 1993 IIHF European Women Championships were held between 22–27 March 1993. In a break with the previous format, the IIHF split the teams into two separate divisions, A and B, and introduced a promotion and relegation system between them.

The top six teams from the 1991 tournament qualified for the Pool A tournament in Esbjerg, Denmark, while the remaining nations played in Ukraine, as  entering their first tournament.

Teams & Format

The six teams, qualified from being the top six teams from the 1991 tournament were:

The teams were divided into two groups of three teams. Each team played each other once within the group. The teams then played a playoff game against the team with the same position in the opposing group, i.e. the Group Winners played off for Gold, 2nd place, for Bronze etc.

First round

Group 1

Standings

Results

Group 2

Standings

Results

Playoffs

Consolation round 5-6 Place

Match for third place

Final

Champions

European Championship Group B

Teams & Format

The five teams that playing the first Pool B were:

The teams were placed in one group containing all the teams playing in a single round robin format, with the final placings determining the final standing without any final games.

Final round

Standings

Results

Final standings

See also
IIHF European Women Championships

External links
 Championnats d'Europe féminins 1993 at PassionHockey.com 

IIHF European Women Championships
Euro
1993
1993
1993 in Danish women's sport
Sport in Esbjerg
Sports competitions in Kyiv
1990s in Kyiv
1992–93 in Danish ice hockey
1992–93 in Ukrainian ice hockey
IIHF European Women Championships
Ice